Ray Howlett (born 1940) is an American artist primarily associated with the light and space movement. He is known as one of the pioneers of infinity light sculptures.

Early life and education
Howlett was born in Lincoln, Nebraska. In 1963, he graduated with a Bachelor of Fine Arts from the University of Nebraska. He moved to Los Angeles in 1965, where he was influenced like many of the other Light and Space artists at the time to experiment with sculptural mediums and became inspired by the interaction of mixing reflective surfaces with electric light. The result was the development of a completely new, complex art form that he calls "Contained Reflective Light Sculpture."

Work
Howlett’s earliest work were painting on large canvases, experimenting with the push and pull of visual space. In 1972, he began making serigraph prints on glass, mounting and spacing them in front of his paintings. This expanded into experiments with mirror and transparent reflective coatings on glass. Finally, incorporating electric lights into his pieces, to increase the dimensional effects, his paintings became sculptural.

In 1975, one of his first light sculptures was singled out by art critic, Alfred Frankenstein, while he called the show “an unmitigated disaster” he noted that “only one has any business being shown in an art museum. That work is called “Vortex” by Ray Howlett.”

Howlett's sculptures create a colorful and abstract optical space larger than the piece itself what he calls an "optically expanding space". In his structural forms, illuminated graphic images appear to be floating within transparent sculptures. The internal composition and colors shift and change as the viewer moves around it.

Museum Permanent Collections
Howlett's work is represented in numerous public collections including;

References

External links 
Official website

1940 births
Living people
Artists from Lincoln, Nebraska
American artists
University of Nebraska alumni
American contemporary artists